Terry Geary is an Australian former professional rugby league footballer who played for the Penrith Panthers in the NSWRL Premiership. He played as a prop forward.

Geary was selected by committee of experts for a Penrith ‘Team of Legends’, representing 40 years of competition in the top grade of Rugby League at Penrith in 2006.

References

External links
Terry Geary stats

Living people
Rugby league props
Penrith Panthers players
Australian rugby league players
Year of birth missing (living people)
Place of birth missing (living people)